The Outside Tour was a tour by English rock musician David Bowie, opening in September 1995 and lasting over a year. The opening shows preceded the release of the 1. Outside album which it supported. The tour visited stops in North America and Europe.

The US leg of the tour was supported by Nine Inch Nails as part of their extended Self Destruct Tour, who segued their set with Bowie's to form a continuous show. Morrissey was the support act for the entire European leg, but withdrew from the tour after nine dates. On selected dates Reeves Gabrels performed songs from his album, The Sacred Squall of Now in addition to performing with Nine Inch Nails and David Bowie.

An official live recording from the tour, Ouvrez le Chien (Live Dallas 95) was released in July 2020, and another, No Trendy Réchauffé (Live Birmingham 95), was released in December 2020.

In a 2012 Rolling Stone reader's poll, the tour (pairing Nine Inch Nails with Bowie) was named one of the top 10 opening acts in rock history.

Background
Bowie released his album Outside in late September 1995, having recorded it from early 1994 through early 1995, for which this tour was named. It was Bowie's first solo tour since he retired his hits during the 1990 Sound+Vision Tour, and his first performances on stage since The Freddie Mercury Tribute Concert in 1992. Initial tour rehearsals were held at the Complete Music Studios in New York before moving to the Mullins Center, where Nine Inch Nails joined the rehearsal.

Of the material for this tour, Bowie said, "We're going to play some older material, sure, but not obvious things. I found, while rehearsing for the [Outside] tour, that older songs I haven't played for years suddenly fit in with this new material quite well – things like ... "Joe the Lion." So I'm quite looking forward to it." Other songs from Bowie's back catalog that he performed during the tour include "Scary Monsters (and Super Creeps)", "Look Back in Anger", "Andy Warhol" and "Breaking Glass".

Bowie said of why he chose to tour with Nine Inch Nails, "I personally did like the combination of NIN and me, but my fans didn't. Bad luck!! It also was an extremely young audience, between about 12 and 17 years old. My starting point was simply: I've just made an adventurous album, what can I do now to turn the concerts as adventurous. Looking at it in that way, it seemed logical to confront myself with the NIN audience. I knew it would be hard to captivate them by music they never heard, by an artist whose name was the only familiar thing.

Trent Reznor has gone on record numerous times as being heavily influenced by David Bowie, and further collaborated with Bowie by remixing "The Hearts Filthy Lesson" and later on 1997's "I'm Afraid of Americans" single. When asked in 1995 if his album Outside was influenced by Nine Inch Nails, Bowie answered, "the band that I was actually quite taken with was three guys from Switzerland call The Young Gods ... I’d been aware of them previous to knowing about Nine Inch Nails."

Set and costume design
For the tour, Bowie went with a modest stage design ("some banners, some mannequins") and avoided the theatrical presentation like his previous Glass Spider Tour in 1987 and Sound+Vision Tour in 1990. The stage "resembled a building site, with paint splashed crumpled sheets draped about", and included an old fashioned table and chair in one corner, onto which Bowie would occasionally climb during shows. Above the stage, a neon sign displayed the phrase "Ouvrez le Chien", a partial lyric from Bowie's 1970 song "All the Madmen", which he repeated in his 1993 song "The Buddha of Suburbia". During the US portion of the tour, an additional neon sign hung above the stage displayed phrases like "Strange Ko", "Noise Angel", "Man Made" or "Street Volva" that changed nightly.

Bowie had a few outfits for the tour (which varied between the European and US shows), but included three jackets designed by Alexander McQueen including the jacket he wore on the cover of the album.

Performance notes

Bowie opened an interview for the tour with USA Today on the opening day of the tour, on 14 September 1995 with the question "How do you commit commercial suicide? Well, you do this: play songs from an album that hasn't been released yet, and complement it with obscure songs from the past that you've never done on stage."

American industrial rock band Prick opened some nights on the US leg, and for some shows, Gabrels would perform songs from his then-new album The Sacred Squall of Now. During the tour, as Nine Inch Nails reached the conclusion of their performance, the two bands played together with both Nine Inch Nails and Bowie and his band performing "Subterraneans", "Hallo Spaceboy" and "Scary Monsters (and Super Creeps)", followed by two Nine Inch Nails songs "Reptile" and "Hurt" after which Bowie continued with his own set alone. A review of the opening night of the tour said that "Moving from NIN to Bowie was like moving from Kansas to Oz. Instead of the stark white stage light beating down like investigation lamps, the stage became awash in color and texture." The same review acknowledged that the shift in music puzzled some in the audience, but overall called the show "an impressive body of new music, splendidly delivered". A review of the following night in Mansfield, Massachusetts was unkind, saying that by the end of the set, "Bowie proved he was not up to sharing the stage with NIN, yet insisted on dragging out his overlong performance to its embarrassingly self-indulgent end."

Early in the tour, the "almost 100% Nails audience" provided a challenge to Bowie, who said "In those first weeks, we had to adjust emotionally to the fact that we were going to be challenged every night to get in sync with what people were coming to the show for. But then you start to recognize that if you're going to continue, you'd better enjoy what you're doing. The more we did that, the more it communicated to the audience. That's how it went from survival to being a good tour."

Bowie signed copies of his album at a local record store while in New York on 26 September 1995.

Morrissey was slated to be the opening act of the European tour, but he suddenly and unexpectedly quit just before the Aberdeen Exhibition Centre performance on 29 November 1995. The support slot was filled on later dates by The Gyres, Echobelly, Placebo, Electrafixion (with Ian McCulloch) and a variety of local bands.

After the 20 February 1996 show in Paris, the band took a break until June, but when the shows resumed the band did not include George Simms, Pete Schwartz or Carlos Alomar. Shows from this "Summer Festivals" leg often included yet-to-be-released tracks from Bowie's upcoming Earthling album.

The Kremlin Palace Concert Hall performance on 18 June 1996 was recorded and a 50-minute broadcast was later shown on Russian Television. Other television coverage included the entire 22 June Loreley Festival performance on German TV (Rockpalast) and excerpts from the Phoenix Festival performance on 18 July broadcast on British TV with BBC Radio broadcasting a six-song selection from the performance. One song from this performance, "The Hearts Filthy Lesson", was released on the live CD LiveAndWell.com (1999/2021). The Tel Aviv and Balingen dates were both broadcast on FM radio in their respective countries.

Live recordings

Dallas, Texas (Ouvrez le Chien (Live Dallas 95))

The 13 October 1995 show, recorded at the Starplex Amphitheater in Dallas Texas, was released on music streaming platforms as David Bowie Ouvrez le Chien (Live Dallas 95) in July 2020 and on CD and vinyl on 30 October 2020. The streaming release includes two live songs recorded at the Birmingham performance as well. Ouvrez le Chien charted at #32 on the UK albums chart. This release is part of the 6-album set Brilliant Live Adventures.

Set list
"Look Back in Anger"
"The Hearts Filthy Lesson"
"The Voyeur of Utter Destruction (As Beauty)"
"I Have Not Been to Oxford Town"
"Outside"
"Andy Warhol"
 "Breaking Glass"
"The Man Who Sold the World"
"We Prick You"
"I’m Deranged"
"Joe the Lion"
"Nite Flights" (Scott Walker)
"Under Pressure"
"Teenage Wildlife"
"Moonage Daydream" (recorded at Birmingham, England) (streaming only)
"Under Pressure" (recorded at Birmingham, England) (streaming only)

Birmingham, England (No Trendy Réchauffé (Live Birmingham 95))

The 13 December 1995 performance at the National Exhibition Centre (Hall 5) in Birmingham, England, billed as the Big Twix Mix Show with Alanis Morissette, Lightning Seeds and Echobelly as support acts, was filmed by BBC TV with excerpts broadcast at a later date. Two songs from this show, "Under Pressure" and "Moonage Daydream", were released as b-sides on Bowie's "Hallo Spaceboy" (1996) single as well as part of the Ouvrez le Chien release. In late 2020, it was announced that Bowie's show, in its entirety, would be released as No Trendy Réchauffé (Live Birmingham 95) on 20 November 2020. The show contains two performances of "Hallo Spaceboy"; one was intended as the video for the song's official single, but that plan was cancelled after the Pet Shop Boys remixed the single instead.  Bowie biographer Nicholas Pegg called the release "bloody marvellous. Tight, urgent, muscular renditions of Scary Monsters, Hallo Spaceboy, The Voyeur, Oxford Town. Possibly the best band he ever had." "No trendy réchauffé" is a partial lyric from the song "Strangers When We Meet", which is included in the setlist for this show. The release is part of the 6-album set Brilliant Live Adventures.

No Trendy Réchauffé hit number 43 on the Scottish album charts.

Set list
 "Look Back in Anger"
 "Scary Monsters (And Super Creeps)"
 "The Voyeur of Utter Destruction (as Beauty)"
 "The Man Who Sold the World"
 "Hallo Spaceboy"
 "I Have Not Been to Oxford Town"
 "Strangers When We Meet"
 "Breaking Glass"
 "The Motel"
 "Jump They Say"
 "Teenage Wildlife"
 "Under Pressure"
Encore:
 "Moonage Daydream"
 "We Prick You"
 "Hallo Spaceboy" (version 2)

Personnel
David Bowie  – vocals
Reeves Gabrels – guitar
Carlos Alomar – guitar, backing vocals
Gail Ann Dorsey – bass guitar, vocals
Zack Alford  – drums
Mike Garson – piano
Peter Schwartz  – synthesizer, musical director 
George Simms  – backing vocals, keyboards
Michael Prowda - monitors
Steve Guest - FOH

Tour dates

"Summer Festival" tour dates

Cancelled shows

Notes

Songs

From The Man Who Sold the World
 "The Man Who Sold the World"
From Hunky Dory
 "Andy Warhol"
From The Rise and Fall of Ziggy Stardust and the Spiders from Mars
 "Moonage Daydream"
From Live Santa Monica '72
 "My Death" (originally from La Valse à Mille Temps (1959) by Jacques Brel; written by Brel & Mort Shuman)
From Ziggy Stardust: The Motion Picture
 "White Light/White Heat" (originally from White Light/White Heat (1968) by The Velvet Underground; written by Lou Reed)
From Aladdin Sane
 "Aladdin Sane"
From Diamond Dogs
 "Diamond Dogs"
From Low
 "Breaking Glass" (Bowie, Dennis Davis, George Murray)
 "What in the World"
 "Subterraneans"
From "Heroes"
 "Heroes"
 "Joe the Lion"
From Lodger
 "DJ" (Bowie, Brian Eno, Carlos Alomar)
 "Look Back in Anger" (Bowie, Eno)
 "Boys Keep Swinging" (Bowie, Eno)
"Yassassin" (Rehearsed but not performed)
From Scary Monsters (and Super Creeps)
 "Scary Monsters (and Super Creeps)"
 "Teenage Wildlife"
From Tin Machine II
 "Baby Universal"
From Black Tie White Noise
 "Jump They Say"
 "Nite Flights" (originally from Nite Flights (1978) by The Walker Brothers; written by Noel Scott Engel)
From Outside
 "Outside" (Bowie, Kevin Armstrong)
 "The Hearts Filthy Lesson" (Bowie, Eno, Reeves Gabrels, Mike Garson, Erdal Kızılçay, Sterling Campbell)
 "A Small Plot of Land" (Bowie, Eno, Gabrels, Garson, Kızılçay)
 "Hallo Spaceboy" (Bowie, Eno)
 "The Motel" (Bowie, Eno)
 "I Have Not Been to Oxford Town" (Bowie, Eno)
 "The Voyeur of Utter Destruction (as Beauty)" (Bowie, Eno, Gabrels)
 "We Prick You" (Bowie, Eno)
 "I'm Deranged" (Bowie, Eno)
 "Thru' These Architect's Eyes" (Bowie, Gabrels)
 "Strangers When We Meet"
From Earthling
 "Little Wonder"
 "Seven Years in Tibet"
 "Telling Lies"
Other songs:
 "Under Pressure" (originally a single (1981) by Bowie and Queen from Queen's Hot Space (1982); written by Bowie, John Deacon, Brian May, Freddie Mercury, Roger Taylor)
 "Hurt" (from The Downward Spiral by Nine Inch Nails; written by Trent Reznor)
 "Reptile" (from The Downward Spiral by Nine Inch Nails, written by Reznor)
 "All the Young Dudes" (originally recorded in 1972 by Mott the Hoople, written and produced by Bowie)
 "Lust for Life" (originally recorded in 1977 by Iggy Pop, written by Bowie and Pop, produced by Bowie)

References

Sources

References
 David Buckley, Strange Fascination: The Definitive Biography of David Bowie, Virgin Books, 1999, 

1995 concert tours
1996 concert tours
David Bowie concert tours
Nine Inch Nails concert tours